Bishops of the Diocese of Linköping, Sweden.

Before the reformation
 Herbert? 
 Rikard?
 1139–1160s Gisle
 1170–1171 Stenar
 1187–1195/96 Kol
 Johannes?
 1216–1220 Karl Magnusson
 1220–1236 Bengt Magnusson
 1236–1258 Lars
 1258–1283 Henrik
 1258–1286 Bo
 1286–1291 Bengt Birgersson
 1292–1307 Lars
 1307–1338 Karl Bååt
 1342–1351 Petrus Torkilsson
 1352–1372 Nils Markusson
 1373–1374 Gottskalk Falkdal
 1375–1391 Nils Hermansson
 1391–1436 Knut Bosson
 1436–1440 ?
 1441–1458 Nils König
 1459–1465 Kettil Karlsson (Vasa)
 1465–1500 Henrik Tidemansson
 1501–1512 Hemming Gadh
 1513–1527 Hans Brask

After the reformation
 1529–1540 Jöns Månsson
 1543–1558 Nicolaus Canuti
 1558–1569 Erik Falck
 1569–1580 Martinus Olai Gestricus
 1583–1587 Petrus Caroli
 1589–1606 Petrus Benedicti
 1606–1630 Jonas Kylander
 1631–1635 Johannes Botvidi
 1637–1644 Jonas Petri Gothus
 1645–1655 Andreas Johannis Prytz
 1655–1670 Samuel Enander
 1671–1678 Johannes Terserus
 1678–1681 Olov Svebilius
 1681–1691 Magnus Pontin
 1693–1711 Haquin Spegel
 1711–1716 Jacob Lang
 1716–1729 Torsten Rudeen
 1730 Johannes Steuchius
 1731–1742 Erik Benzelius the younger
 1743–1761 Andreas Olavi Ryzelius
 1761–1780 Petrus Filenius
 1780–1786 Uno von Troil
 1786–1805 Jakob Axelsson Lindblom
 1805–1808 Magnus Lehnberg
 1809–1819 Carl von Rosenstein
 1819–1833 Marcus Wallenberg
 1833–1861 Johan Jacob Hedrén
 1861–1884 Ebbe Gustaf Bring
 1884–1893 Carl Alfred Cornelius
 1893–1906 Carl Wilhelm Charlewille
 1907–1910 Otto Ahnfelt
 1910–1926 John Personne
 1927–1935 Erik Aurelius
 1936–1947 Tor Andrae
 1947–1959 Torsten Ysander
 1959–1980 Ragnar Askmark
 1980–1995 Martin Lönnebo
 1995–2011 Martin Lind
 2011–2022 Martin Modéus

 
Bishops of Link
Linkoping